Chatham is a town located within the Medway unitary authority in the ceremonial county of Kent, England. The town forms a conurbation with neighbouring towns Gillingham, Rochester, Strood and Rainham.

The town developed around Chatham Dockyard and several Army barracks, together with 19th-century forts which provided a defensive shield for the dockyard. The Corps of Royal Engineers is still based in Chatham at Brompton Barracks.

The Dockyard closed in 1984, but the remaining major naval buildings are an attraction for a flourishing tourist industry. Following closure, part of the site was developed as a commercial port, other parts were redeveloped for business and residential use, and part was used as the Chatham Historic Dockyard museum. Its attractions include the submarine .

The town has important road links and the railway and bus stations are the main interchanges for the area.  It is the administrative headquarters of Medway unitary authority, as well as its principal shopping centre.

History
The name Chatham was first recorded as Cetham in 880.  The Domesday Book records the place as Ceteham.

Most books explain this name as a British root ceto (like Welsh coed), plus Old English ham, meaning a forest settlement.
The river-valley site of Chatham is, however, more consistent with cet being an Old English survival of the element catu, that was common in Roman-era names and meant 'basin' or 'valley'.

The A2 road passes by Chatham along the line of the ancient Celtic route. It was paved by the Romans, and named Watling Street by the Anglo-Saxons. Among archaeological finds here have been the remains of a Roman-era cemetery.

Chatham was long a small village on the banks of the river. By the 16th century, warships were being moored at Jillingham water (Gillingham), because of its strategic sheltered location between London and the Continent. It was established as a Royal Dockyard by Queen Elizabeth I in 1568, and most of the dockyard lies within Gillingham. Initially a refitting base, it became a shipbuilding yard; from then until the late 19th century, further expansion of the yard took place. In its time, many thousands of men were employed at the dockyard, and many hundreds of vessels were launched there, including HMS Victory, which was built there in the 1760s. After World War I, many submarines were also built in Chatham Dockyard.

In addition to the dockyard, defensive fortifications were built to protect it from attack. Upnor Castle had been built in 1567, but had proved ineffectual; the Dutch raid on the Medway in 1667 showed that more defences were required. The fortifications, which became more elaborate as the threat of invasion grew, were begun in 1756 as a complex across the neck of the peninsula formed by the bend in the River Medway, and included Fort Amherst. The threat of a land-based attack from the south during the 19th century led to the construction of more forts.

The second phase of fort-building (1806–1819) included Fort Pitt (later used as a hospital and the site of the first Army Medical School). The 1859 Royal Commission on the Defence of the United Kingdom ordered, inter alia, a third outer ring of forts: these included Fort Luton, Fort Bridgewood, and Fort Borstal.

These fortifications all required military personnel to man them and Army barracks to house those men. These included Kitchener Barracks (c 1750–1780), the Royal Marine Barracks (c 1780), Brompton Artillery Barracks (1806) and Melville Barracks (opened 1820 as a Naval hospital, RM barracks from 1905). H.M.S. Collingwood and H.M.S. Pembroke were both naval barracks.

In response to the huge manpower needs, the village of Chatham and other nearby villages and towns grew commensurately. Trams, and later buses, linked those places to bring in the workforce. The area between the High Street and Luton village illustrates part of that growth, with its many streets of Victorian terraces.

The importance of Chatham Dockyard gradually declined as Britain's naval resources were reduced or moved to other locations, and eventually, on the 31st March 1984, it was closed completely. The dockyard buildings were preserved as the historic site Chatham Historic Dockyard (operated by Chatham Historic Dockyard Trust), which was under consideration as a World Heritage Site the site is being used for other purposes. Part of the St Mary's Island section is now used as a marina, and the remainder is being developed for housing, commercial and other uses, branded as "Chatham Maritime".

Governance

Chatham lost its independence as a borough under the Local Government Act 1972, by which, on 1 April 1974, it became part of the Borough of Medway, a non-metropolitan district of the county of Kent; under subsequent renaming the Borough became the Borough of Rochester-upon-Medway (1979); and, from 1982, the City of Rochester-upon-Medway. Under the most recent change, in 1998, and with the addition of the Borough of Gillingham, the Borough of Medway became a unitary authority area, administratively separate from Kent. It remains part of the county of Kent for ceremonial purposes.

Medway Council has recently relocated its main administration building to Gun Wharf, the site of the earliest part of the Dockyard, a former Lloyd's office building. It was built between 1976 and 1978 and is Grade II listed.

Chatham is currently part of the parliamentary constituency of Chatham and Aylesford. Prior to 1997, Chatham had been included in the constituencies of Mid Kent, Rochester and Chatham and Chatham.

Chatham has proven to be a marginal parliamentary seat. Since 1945, the members of parliament for Chatham have been as follows:

Geography

Chatham is situated where the lower part of the dip slope of the North Downs meets the River Medway which at this point is flowing in a south–north direction. This gives the right bank, where the town stands, considerable advantages from the point of view of river use. Compared with opposite bank, the river is fast-flowing and deep; the illustration (1), an early print of the settlement, is taken from the point where Fort Pitt now stands. The town lies below at river level, curving round to occupy a south-easterly trending valley (The Brook"), in which lies the High Street. Beyond the Chatham Dockyard was marshy land, now called St Mary's Island, and has several new developments of housing estates. The New Road crosses the scene below the vantage point of the illustration.

Illustration (2) is taken from the opposite side of the valley: the Pentagon Shopping Centre is to the right, with the building on the ridge left of centre, Fort Pitt and Rochester lies beyond that ridge; and Frindsbury is on the rising ground in the right distance.

The valley continues southeastwards as the Luton Valley, in which is the erstwhile village of that name; and Capstone Valley. The Darland Banks, the northern slopes of the Luton Valley above these valleys, are unimproved chalk grassland. The photograph (3), taken from the Banks and looking south, shows the village in the centre, with the rows of Victorian terraced housing, which unusually follow the contour lines. The opposite slopes are the ‘’Daisy Banks'’ and ‘’Coney Banks'’, along which some of the defensive forts were built (including Fort Luton, in the trees to the left)

Until the start of the 20th century, most of the south part of the borough was entirely rural, with a number of farms and large tracts of woodland. The beginning of what is now Walderslade was when a speculative builder began to build the core of the village in Walderslade Bottoms.

Demography
Chatham became a market town in its own right in the 19th century, and a municipal borough in 1890. By 1831 its population had reached more than 16,000. By 1961 it had reached 48,800.

Economy
The closure of the Royal Navy Dockyard on the 31st March 1984 had the effect of changing the employment statistics of the town. About 7,000 people lost their jobs. The unemployment rate went up to 23.5%. From early April 1984 to December 1985, and onwards, the Medway Towns began to have an increase in alcohol and drug related, anti-social behaviour, which many residents then realized had largely been caused by the closure of the Royal Navy Dockyard in 1984, and the resulting mass redundancies which occurred. There has been a concerted effort to revitalise the Thames Gateway area and one of the largest employers in Chatham is now Vanquis Bank Ltd, a subsidiary of Vanquis Banking Group.

Landmarks
The Chatham Naval Memorial commemorates the 18,500 officers, ranks and ratings of the Royal Navy who were lost or buried at sea in World War One and World War Two. The Chatham Naval Memorial was originally constructed from March 1924 to October 1924. The addition of the obelisk and Portland Stone plaque walls and surroundings were constructed between June 1952 to October 1952. It stands on the Great Lines, the escarpment ridge between Chatham and Gillingham. The Grade II listed building Chatham Town Hall was built in January 1900; it stands in The Brook, and is of a unique architectural design. With Chatham being part of the Medway Towns, it took on a new role as the Medway Arts Centre in April 1987, with the promotional motto "Putting The Arts Back Into The Medway". There were many events held within the Medway Arts Centre, including many stage plays, themed nights and snooker tournaments. Likewise during May 1990, the Medway Arts Centre organized a large parade, composed of dancers, musicians, artists and sculptors, who stood upon theatrical lorry floats. The vehicles were initially parked up next to the entrance into the Theatre Royal Cafe, that was a popular restaurant in the Chatham Town Hall, on Whiffens Avenue, and then started to travel into Chatham, Rochester, Strood and Frindsbury, where sweets, chocolate, posters, badges, leaflets, stickers and t-shirts were handed out to the crowds, to promote the Medway Arts Centre. Then in April 1997, the Medway Arts Centre became the Brook Theatre. The Pentagon Shopping Centre stands in the town centre and serviced the old Pentagon Bus Station that was closed in September 2011. Chatham Waterfront bus station opened in October 2011, replacing the town's previous Pentagon Bus Station which was opened in 1970, before the Pentagon Shopping Centre was opened in 1975, and was considered an unwelcoming environment for passengers. This was because of the diesel fumes from the buses, coaches and minibuses, and because the waiting areas would sometimes become very crowded, whenever large groups of customers from the Pentagon Shopping Centre used the stairs and escalators, to get on board the green buses, coaches and minibuses that were managed by Maidstone & District Motor Services.

Transport

The Medway, apart from Chatham Dockyard, has always had an important role in communication: historically it provided a means for the transport of goods to and from the interior of Kent. Stone, timber and iron from the Weald for shipbuilding and agricultural produce were among the cargoes. Sun Pier in Chatham was one of many such along the river. By 1740, barges of forty tons could navigate as far upstream as Tonbridge. Today its use is confined to tourist traffic; apart from the marina, there are many yacht moorings on the river itself.

The position of the road network in Chatham began with the building of the Roman road (Watling Street, which passed through the town. Turnpike trusts were established locally, so that the length from Chatham to Canterbury was turnpiked in 1730; and the Chatham to Maidstone road (now the A230) was also turnpiked before 1750. The High Street was bypassed in 1769, by the New Road (see illustration (1)) leading from the top of Star Hill Rochester, to the bottom of Chatham Hill at Luton Arches. This also became inadequate for the London cross-channel traffic and the Medway Towns Bypass, the M2 motorway, was constructed to divert through traffic south of the Medway Towns.

Chatham is the hub of the Medway Towns. This fact means that the existing road system has always proved inadequate for the amount of traffic it has to handle, and various schemes have been tried by Rochester-Upon-Medway City Council, to alleviate the congestion. The High Street itself is traffic free, so all traffic on Best Street and Railway Street has to skirt around it. The basic west–east routes are The Brook to the north and New Road to the south, but the additional problems caused by the situation of the Pentagon Bus Station meant that conflicting traffic flows were the result, from 1975 and onward. From April 1986 and onward until October 1987, the town centre remodelling of Chatham began, and Railway Street was realigned into becoming part of an inner ring road, that became a one-way system. This redevelopment included the demolition of the House of Holland department store in January 1987, and the construction of the Sir John Hawkins Flyover in Chatham, that was opened in February 1989, so the traffic could be carried from south to north over the High Street.

In September 2006, the one-way system was abandoned and two-way traffic reintroduced on most of the ring-road system. Further work on the road system commenced early in 2009, and as of early 2010, the demolition of the Sir John Hawkins Flyover has been completed. It was replaced by a street-level, buses only, road coupled with repositioning of the bus station. The new Waterfront bus station opened in October 2011.

Chatham railway station, opened in 1858, serves both the North Kent and the Chatham Main Lines, and is the interchange between the two lines. It lies in the valley between the Fort Pitt and the Chatham Tunnels. There are three trains an hour to London Victoria, two trains an hour to London Charing Cross, two trains an hour to Luton (via London Bridge, St Pancras and Luton Airport Parkway) and two services an hour to St Pancras via High Speed 1. The former services run to Dover and Ramsgate; the Charing Cross services terminate at Gillingham and the High Speed services terminate at Faversham.

Part of the industrial railway in what is now Chatham Historic Dockyard is still in operation, run by the North Kent Industrial Locomotive Society.

Buses are operated by Arriva Southern Counties and Nu-Venture to various destinations. They serve other towns in Medway including Gillingham, Grain, Strood and Rochester and also to other towns in Kent including Maidstone, Gravesend, Blue Bell Hill and Sittingbourne. There is also an express bus via Strood and Rochester and A2 to Bluewater in Greenhithe.

Religion
In the 19th century the ecclesiastical parish of Chatham included Luton and Brompton and also Chatham Intra (land on the river that was administered by the City of Rochester).
Chatham's parish church, St Marys, which stood on Dock Road, was rebuilt in 1788. St John's was a Waterloo church built in 1821 by Robert Smirke, and restructured in 1869 by Gordon Macdonald Hills; it ceased being an active church in 1964, and is currently used as an art project. St Paul's New Road was built in 1854; declared redundant in 1974, it has been demolished. St Peter's Troy Town was built in 1860. Christchurch Luton was built in 1843, replaced in 1884. The Royal Dockyard church (1806) was declared redundant in 1981.

St Michael's is a Roman Catholic church, that was built in 1863. There is a Unitarian Chapel built in 1861.

Chatham is reputed to be the home of the first Baptist chapel in north Kent, the Zion Baptist Chapel in Clover Street. The first known pastor was Edward Morecock who settled there in the 1660s. During Cromwell's time Morecock had been a sea-captain and had been injured in battle. His knowledge of the River Medway is reputed to have preserved him from persecution in the reign of King Charles II.
There was a second Baptist chapel founded about 1700. The Ebenezer Chapel dates back to 1662.

Chatham Memorial Synagogue was built by Simon Magnus in 1867 on the Chatham end of Rochester High Street in Rochester.

Education
For a full list of schools serving Chatham visit List of schools in Medway

Sports
The town's Association Football club, Chatham Town F.C., plays in the Southern Counties East Football League, as do Lordswood F.C. The defunct Chatham Excelsior F.C. were one of the early pioneers of football in Southern England.
Football league side Gillingham F.C. are seen to represent Medway as a whole.
Holcombe Hockey Club is one of the largest in the country, and are based in Chatham. The men's 1st XI are part of the England Hockey League.

Kite Flying is possible, especially power kiting on the Great Lines Heritage Park (between Gillingham and Chatham) and at Capstone Farm Country Park.

Skiing is also possible near Capstone Farm Country Park at Capstone Ski Slope and Snowboard Centre.

Popular culture

On a cultural level, Chatham gave birth to several movements in literature, art and music. In the period from 1977 until 1982 the Medway Delta Sound emerged. The term was coined as a joke by Chatham born writer painter and musician Billy Childish after Russ Wilkins' Medway based record label, Empire Records, used the phrase "From The Medway Delta". Several Medway Delta bands gained international recognition, including The Milkshakes, The Prisoners (see also James Taylor Quartet) and The Dentists.

Out of the Kent Institute of Art & Design (KIAD), now the University for the Creative Arts (UCA) came the band known as Wang Chung. The vocalist and guitarist with Wang Chung, Jeremy Ryder, who is better known as Jack Hues attended KIAD. Alongside such individuals was Alan Denman, who became a well established lecturer at KIAD, and who founded The Flying Circuits in 1984, which became an urban theatre movement in the Medway Towns. Many students from KIAD played various acting roles within The Flying Circuits, in Chatham, Gillingham and London. The scenes that were performed by The Flying Circuits, were entirely based upon excerpts from the screenplay by Alan Denman, called the Electronic Town, that he wrote between January 1984 to October 1984, and which concerned a futuristic science fiction dystopia. Alan Denman also helped to form The Medway Poets with Billy Childish, Robert Earl, Bill Lewis, Sexton Ming and Charles Thomson. The Medway Poets used to meet regularly at the York Tavern & Railway Inn, in Ordnance Street, within Chatham, from 1974 to 1985, near to the Kent Institute of Art & Design (KIAD) at Fort Pitt in Rochester, and Chatham railway station. Chatham has always had a strong musical and creative arts heritage that has remained centred on local groups, many of whom were also part of the KIAD. Charles Thomson and Billy Childish went on to create the artistic movement known as Stuckism in 1999.

There was a resurgence in the live music scene in early 2001, with an initial focus on the Tap 'n' Tin venue in Chatham. The essence of the original greatness of the Medway Delta Sound was revived by music and poetry evenings promoted by David Wise's Urban Fox Press, which also published several books by Medway poets and artists. In 2008. the independent arts organisation Medway Eyes was founded, specialising in music and photography. It had promoted several arts exhibitions and gigs at The Barge, that was located at 63 Layfield Road, in Gillingham (now closed) and The Nags Head at 292 High Street, in Rochester, but then in 2013 it disbanded.

The Medway Poets were formed in 1975 and disbanded in 1982 having performed at the Kent Literature Festival and many others in South East England and on TV and Radio. They became a major influence to writers in the Medway Towns. From the core of this group the anti conceptual/pro painting movement of Remodernism came into being.

Recent Medway artists of note include Kid Harpoon, Crybaby Special and The Monsters, Red Light, Underground Heroes, Tyrannosaurus Alan, Pete Molinari, Lupen Crook, Brigadier Ambrose, Stuart Turner and Theatre Royal.

The term 'Chav', research suggests, does not derive from Chatham's name ("Chatham Average"), but is derived from the Romany word for 'youngster'. Before the Chatham Dockyard was closed down on the 31st March 1984, the cultural idea of the Chav did not actually exist in the Medway Towns.

Local media

Newspapers
Local newspapers for Chatham include Medway News and Medway Standard, both published by Kent Regional News and Media; and the Medway Messenger, published by the KM Group. The town also has free newspapers in the Medway Extra (KM Group) and yourmedway (KOS Media).

Radio
The local commercial radio station for Chatham is KMFM Medway, owned by the KM Group. Medway is also served by community radio station Radio Sunlightbased in Richmond road between the high street and the River Medway. The area can also receive the county wide stations BBC Radio Kent, Heart and Gold, as well as many radio stations in Essex and Greater London.

Notable people

Charles Dickens lived in the town as a boy, both in 'The Brook, Chatham' and in Ordnance Terrace before Chatham railway station was built just opposite. He subsequently described it as the happiest period of his childhood, and eventually returned to the area in adulthood when he bought a house in nearby Gad's Hill. Medway features in his novels. He then moved to Rochester, a nearby town, also part of the Medway Towns.

Others who were born or who lived or live in Chatham:
Sir Jacob Ackworth (1668-1748) shipbuilder
Asquith Xavier, ended a colour bar at British Railways in London by fighting to become the first non-white train guard at Euston railway station.
Percy Whitlock, organist and post-romantic composer
Kid Harpoon, singer, songwriter, musician and record producer. Born and lived in Chatham. Working with award-winning artists including Jessie Ware, Shawn Mendes, Harry Styles, Florence and The Machine, Haim and Year & Years.
Richard Dadd, Victorian-era painter and patricide
William Coles Finch, author and historian, lived at Luton, Chatham.
Elizabeth Benger, biographer, novelist and poet, was brought up here between 1782 and 1797.
Billy Childish, artist, poet, and musician
Tracey Emin, artist and member of the Young British Artists
Zandra Rhodes, CBE, RDI, designer
Bill Lewis, poet, painter, storyteller and mythographer
William Ridsdel, Salvation Army Commissioner, lived in the town from 1877 to 1878.
William Cuffay, Chartist leader and tailor, born in Chatham in 1788
 Gemma Lavender, astronomer, journalist and author, born in Chatham in 1986
Thomas Hodgskin, an early socialist, was born and raised in Chatham. His work would go on to influence Karl Marx.

Entertainers
Tommy Knight, actor
Stel Pavlou, author and screenwriter, attended the Chatham Grammar School for Boys
Lee Ryan, boy-band singer, also attended the Chatham Grammar School for Boys
Ben Mills, singer and X-Factor contestant
Anne Dudley, composer, pop musician and member of The Art of Noise
Kevin Eldon, stand-up comedian
Glenn Shorrock, entertainer, birthplace (Little River Band founder, lead singer)

Sportsmen
Dave Whitcombe, twice BDO World Darts Championship Finalist.
Kevin Hunt, former captain of the Bohemians, a League of Ireland club
Ashley Jackson, England international hockey player
Keith Donohue, Devon cricketer
Chris Smalling, England international footballer, attended Chatham Grammar School for Boys.
Andrew Crofts, professional footballer, currently playing for Newport County.
Neil Shipperley, professional footballer, formerly of Crystal Palace FC and Wimbledon FC.
George Boyd, professional footballer, currently playing for Peterborough United and was born in Chatham
Lee Minshull, professional footballer, AFC Wimbledon and was born in Chatham.
Johnny Armour, professional boxer, British Commonwealth, European and World Boxing Union bantamweight champion was born and resides in Chatham.
George Thorne, professional footballer, was born in Chatham.
Ryan Richards, professional basketball player, drafted by the San Antonio Spurs in the 2010 NBA draft

Twin towns
 Valenciennes, France

See also
Rainham
Chatham, Massachusetts, a city often twinned with Chatham

References

Bibliography
Hughes, David (2004), Chatham Naval Dockyard and Barracks, The History Press

External links

Archive Images
The Chatham News Index (1899–1965)

 
Towns in Kent
Ports and harbours of Kent
Unparished areas in Kent
Medway